GMERS Medical College and Hospital, Valsad, established in 2014, is a medical college situated in Valsad, Gujarat. The college imparts the degree Bachelor of Medicine and Surgery (MBBS). Nursing and para-medical courses are also offered. The college is affiliated to Veer Narmad South Gujarat University and is recognized by Medical Council of India. The hospital associated with the college is one of the largest hospitals in the Valsad. The selection of the college is done on the basis of merit through National Eligibility and Entrance Test. Yearly undergraduate student intake is 200.

Courses
GMERS Medical College and Hospital, Valsad undertakes education and training of students MBBS courses. This college is offering 200 MBBS seats from 2019 of which 85% Seats are of state quota and 15% is for Nation Counselling.

References

External links 
 http://www.gmersmcvalsad.com/

Medical colleges in Gujarat